The Roman Catholic Diocese of São Gabriel da Cachoeira is a diocese located in the city of São Gabriel da Cachoeira in the Ecclesiastical province of Manaus in Brazil.

The  Bishop is Mgr Edson Taschetto Damian. He was named on March, 4th, 2009, and was blessed on May, 24th, 2009.

History
 May 1, 1925: Established as Territorial Prelature of Rio Negro
 October 30, 1980: Promoted as Diocese of Rio Negro
 October 21, 1981: Renamed as Diocese of São Gabriel da Cachoeira

Bishops

Ordinaries, in reverse chronological order
 Bishops of São Gabriel da Cachoeira (Roman rite), below
 Bishop Edson Taschetto Damian (2009.03.04 - present)
 Bishop José Song Sui-Wan, S.D.B. (宋瑞雲) (2002.01.23 – 2009.03.04)
 Bishop Walter Ivan de Azevedo, S.D.B. (1988.02.27 – 2002.01.23)
 Bishop Michele Alagna Foderá, S.D.B. (1981.10.21 – 1988.02.27)
 Bishops of Rio Negro (Roman Rite), below
 Bishop Michele Alagna Foderá, S.D.B. (1980.10.30 – 1981.10.21)
 Prelates of Rio Negro (Roman Rite), below
 Bishop Michele Alagna Foderá, S.D.B. (1967.06.13 – 1980.10.30)
 Bishop Pedro Massa, S.D.B. (1941.04.05 – 1967.06.13)

Coadjutor bishops
José Domitrovitsch, S.D.B. (1949-1961), as Coadjutor Prelate; did not succeed to see; appointed Prelate of Humaitá, Amazonas
João Batista Marchesi, S.D.B. (1962-1967), as Coadjutor Prelate; did not succeed to see
Walter Ivan de Azevedo, S.D.B. (1986-1988)

References
 GCatholic.org
 Catholic Hierarchy

Roman Catholic dioceses in Brazil
Christian organizations established in 1925
São Gabriel da Cachoeira, Roman Catholic Diocese of
Roman Catholic dioceses and prelatures established in the 20th century